Basawaraj Mattimud is an Indian politician who is the current Member of the Karnataka Legislative Assembly from Gulbarga Rural (Vidhana Sabha constituency) in the 2018 Karnataka Legislative Assembly election as a member of the Bharatiya Janata Party. Before contesting MLA election, he worked as zilla panchayat member from Adaki in Sedam taluk.

References

Living people
Karnataka MLAs 2018–2023
Bharatiya Janata Party politicians from Karnataka
People from Kalaburagi
1980 births